William "Willy" Damson (22 January 1894 in Germersheim am Rhein – December 1944 in Dachau concentration camp) was a German politician (NSDAP ).

Life and work
After attending the Volksschule and a Humanist Gymnasium, Willy Damson completed a banking apprenticeship, then worked in bank business until 1924. After that he worked as an independent merchant until 1933.

In the NSDAP (member No. 336.620) Damson committed himself from 1933 to 1934 in the German Labor Front. From 1933 to 1934 he also sat in the municipal council of the city of Kehl on the Rhine. In February 1934, he became a member of the Reichsrevisionamt of the NSDAP, where he served as Reichsoberrevisor. After the cleansing wave of the National Socialists of the early summer of 1934, which had become known as Rohm's Putsch , in the course of which large parts of the leadership departments of the Sturmabteilung (SA) were liquidated or arrested, Damson became a leader of the administrative office on 4 July 1934. At the same time, he acted as a provisional agent with the office of the treasurer in the Supreme SA leadership.

Damson continued his work as head of the main office II (Reichshaushaltsamt) with the Reichsschatzmeister of the NSDAP until 1943. In addition to this, he was appointed chief of the NSDAP, commissioner of the Reichsschatzmeister in the committee for HJ -Heim procurement, and on 13 January 1942, as commissioner of the Reichsschatzmeister in national questions.

From March 1936. to the end of his term on 22 March 1944, Damson sat as a deputy in the National Socialist Diet, in which he first represented the electoral district 15 (Osthannover) until April 1938, and then, until his departure, the 18th constituency (Westfalen Süd).

In 1944, due to a case of corruption in the Germanic control center in Brussels, Damson was arrested and admitted to the Dachau concentration camp, where he died in December of the same year.

See also 
 :de:Willy Damson

References 
 Joachim Lilla / Martin Döring: extras in uniform. The members of the Reichstag 1933-1945 , Droste, Düsseldorf 2004. Spezial:  
 Erich Stockhorst: 5000 heads - Who was what in the Third Reich? Kiel, 2000, Spezial:

External links 
 Willy Damson in the data bank of the Reichstagsabgegeordneten

References 

Nazi Party members
1894 births
1944 deaths
Members of the Reichstag of Nazi Germany
Sturmabteilung officers
German people who died in Dachau concentration camp
People from Germersheim